The 1997 Toshiba Classic was a women's tennis tournament played on outdoor hard courts at the La Costa Resort and Spa in San Diego, California in the United States that was part of Tier II of the 1997 WTA Tour. It was the 19th edition of the tournament and was held from July 28 through August 3, 1997. First-seeded Martina Hingis won the singles title.

Finals

Singles

 Martina Hingis defeated  Monica Seles 7–6, 6–4
 It was Hingis' 9th singles title of the year and the 11th of her career.

Doubles

 Martina Hingis /  Arantxa Sánchez Vicario defeated  Amy Frazier /  Kimberly Po 6–3, 7–5
 It was Hingis' 14th title of the year and the 20th of her career. It was Sánchez Vicario's 4th title of the year and the 77th of her career.

References

External links
 ITF tournament edition details
 Tournament draws

Toshiba Classic
Southern California Open
Toshiba Classic
1997 in American tennis